UTC−04:30 is an identifier for a time offset from UTC of −04:30.

History
It was used only in Venezuela, first between 1912 and 1965, and again from December 9, 2007 to May 1, 2016. Currently, Venezuela's time zone is UTC−04:00.

See also
Time in Venezuela

References

UTC offsets
Time in Venezuela